Branislav Krunić (born 28 January 1979) is a Bosnian professional football manager and former player.

International career
Krunić made his debut for Bosnia and Herzegovina on 11 October 2002, against Germany. After that match, Krunić was recalled by Fuad Muzurović in March 2007, for UEFA Euro 2008 qualifying. In total, Krunić played four times at the qualifying. After Muzurović was sacked, Krunić was selected once for the national team by Miroslav Blažević.

He earned a total of 6 caps, scoring no goals. His final international was a November 2008 friendly match against Slovenia.

Managerial career
Krunić retired from football on 15 March 2013, because the issue in football had overshadowed the risk of heart disease, but later returned again as a player-manager to the then Bosnian fourth division club Željezničar Banja Luka, who he led in the First League of RS during the 2017–18 season.

He again retired in May 2018, but once again came out of retirement in November 2018 and came back to Željezničar Banja Luka. In January 2019, he left Željezničar and once again retired from the game and decided to focus only on his managerial career.

From June to October 2018, he was manager of Krupa in the Bosnian Premier League.

On 9 June 2019, it was announced that Krunić became the new manager of Borac Banja Luka. He led Borac to a third-place finish in the first half of the 2019–20 season, with the same number of points as second placed Željezničar and only one point less than first placed Sarajevo. On 5 March 2020, Krunić was sacked after 0–2 defeats against Sarajevo in the league and Željezničar in the cup, with Borac being in poor form.

On 23 June 2021, he was named as the new manager of Leotar, also in the Bosnian Premier League. Krunić was sacked as Leotar's manager in December 2021.

Managerial statistics

Honours

Player
Leotar 
First League of RS: 2001–02
Bosnian Premier League: 2002–03

Borac Banja Luka
Bosnian Premier League: 2010–11
Republika Srpska Cup: 2010–11, 2011–12

Željezničar Banja Luka
Second League of RS: 2016–17 (West)
Regional League of RS: 2015–16 (West)

References

External links

1979 births
Living people
People from Trebinje
Serbs of Bosnia and Herzegovina
Association football midfielders
Bosnia and Herzegovina footballers
Bosnia and Herzegovina international footballers
FK Leotar players
NK Olimpija Ljubljana (1945–2005) players
FC Volyn Lutsk players
FC Tom Tomsk players
FC Moscow players
FC Dynamo Bryansk players
FK Borac Banja Luka players
FK Željezničar Banja Luka players
Premier League of Bosnia and Herzegovina players
Slovenian PrvaLiga players
Ukrainian Premier League players
Russian Premier League players
Russian First League players
First League of the Republika Srpska players
Bosnia and Herzegovina expatriate footballers
Expatriate footballers in Slovenia
Bosnia and Herzegovina expatriate sportspeople in Slovenia
Expatriate footballers in Ukraine
Bosnia and Herzegovina expatriate sportspeople in Ukraine
Expatriate footballers in Russia
Bosnia and Herzegovina expatriate sportspeople in Russia
Bosnia and Herzegovina football managers
FK Željezničar Banja Luka managers
FK Krupa managers
FK Borac Banja Luka managers
FK Leotar managers
Premier League of Bosnia and Herzegovina managers